The 2022 LPGA Tour was the 73rd edition of the LPGA Tour, a series of professional golf tournaments for elite female golfers from around the world. The season began at the Hilton Grand Vacations Tournament of Champions, in Lake Buena Vista, Florida on January 20, and ended on November 20, at the Tiburón Golf Club in the CME Group Tour Championship at Naples, Florida. The tournaments were sanctioned by the United States-based Ladies Professional Golf Association (LPGA).

Schedule and results
The number in parentheses after each winners' name is the player's total number of wins in official money individual events on the LPGA Tour, including that event. Tournament and winner names in bold indicate LPGA majors. The schedule and purse amount for each tournament is listed on the LPGA website. The LPGA has a standard formula for payout percentages and distribution of its purse and prize money for every event. The winner typically gets 15% of the total, second place gets 9.3%, third place 6.75%, etc.

The total prize money to be won increased to $88.9 million for the 34 scheduled to be played, $19.7 million more than in 2021, with another $3.2 million increase announced by the U.S. Women's Open from $6.8 million to $10 million, the largest purse in women's golf, in January 2022. The 2021 total was $69.2 million in its 30 played tournaments, with five canceled. The CME Group Tour Championship then had that tournament's purse at $5 million, and the winner's share of $1.5 million. For 2022, it will offer a larger purse of $7 million, and pay the winner $2.0 million, the largest winner's payout ever in woman's golf, with the year's purse now $90.9 million. The KPMG Women's PGA Championship on June 21, announced a doubling of its purse from $4.5 million to $9 million for the second-highest on the tour, with the winner now receiving $1.35 million from $675,0000. The total purse for 2022 jumps from $90.9 million to a new record $95.4 million. The Evian Championship announced its purse increase from $4.5 million to $6.5 million, and the winner's share jumps from $675,000 to $1 million.  The total purse for 2022 is now a record $97.4 million. The Buick LPGA Shanghai event, with a purse of $2.1 million was canceled on July 6, dropping the total for the year to $95.3 million. The AIG Women's Open increased its purse and winner's share on August 3, from $6.8 million ($1.02 million), to $7.3 million ($1.095 million) The purse for 2022 increases $500,000 to $95.8 million. The Taiwan Swinging Skirts LPGA, with a purse of $2.2 million, was canceled on August 10 due to ongoing COVID-19-related travel restrictions, dropping the total for the year to $93.6 million. The Portland Classic increased its purse $100,000 to $1.5 million on May 11, total for 2022 now $93.7 million. The Volunteers of America Classic tournament starting on September 29, increased its purse $200,000 from its previous $1.5 million, pushing the 2022 total to $93.9 million.

Key

Statistics leaders

Money list leaders

 
Source and complete list: LPGA official website.

Scoring average

Source and complete list: LPGA official website.

See also
2022 Ladies European Tour
2022 Epson Tour

Notes

References

LPGA Tour seasons
LPGA Tour